Wabash is an impact crater  on Mars. The crater was named after the town of Wabash, Indiana, United States, by IAU in 1976.

References 

Impact craters on Mars